The Malaysia men's national under-16 basketball team is a national basketball team of Malaysia, governed by the Malaysia Basketball Association.
It represents the country in international under-16 (under age 16) basketball competitions.

Current roster
Malaysia's roster at the 5th FIBA Under-16 Asian Championship:

Competitions

FIBA Asia U-16 Championship

SEABA U-16 Championship

See also
Malaysia men's national basketball team
Malaysia men's national under-19 basketball team
Malaysia women's national under-16 basketball team

References

External links
 Archived records of Malaysia team participations

Basketball teams in Malaysia
Men's national under-16 basketball teams
Basketball